Nelson County is a county located in the Commonwealth of Virginia, in the United States. As of the 2020 census, the population was 14,775. Its county seat is Lovingston. Nelson County is part of the Charlottesville, VA, Metropolitan Statistical Area.

History 
At the time the English began settling Virginia in the 1600s, the inhabitants of what is now Nelson County were a Siouan-speaking tribe called the Nahyssan. They were probably connected to the Manahoac.

Nelson County was created in 1807 from Amherst County. The government was formed the following year. The county is named for Thomas Nelson Jr., a signer of the U.S. Declaration of Independence, who served as Governor of Virginia in 1781. An earlier Virginia county, also named in his honor, became part of Kentucky when it separated from Virginia in 1792.

Hurricane Camille 

On the night of August 19–20, 1969, Nelson County was struck by disastrous flooding caused by Hurricane Camille. There were reports of animals drowning in trees and people who had had to cup their hands around their mouth and nose to breathe.

Flash floods and mudslides killed 153 people, 31 from Roseland, Tyro, and Massies Mill alone. Over 133 public bridges were washed out in Nelson County, while some communities were under water. In the tiny community of Davis Creek, 52 people were killed or could not be found; only 3 of 35 homes were left standing after the floodwaters receded. The entire county was virtually cut off, with many roads and virtually all bridges, telephone, radio, TV, and electric service interrupted.

The waters of the Tye, Piney, Buffalo, and Rockfish rivers flow into the James River. There was severe flooding elsewhere in Virginia, such as along the Maury River, which destroyed the town of Glasgow in Rockbridge County.

Just a few miles further downstream, the James River crested at the City Locks in Richmond at  swamping downtown areas and also flooding a substantial portion of South Richmond (formerly the separate city of Manchester). The Hurricane Camille disaster did over $140 million (in 1969 dollars) in damage across Virginia, however in no other place in Virginia was the storm as devastating and deadly as in Nelson County, where one percent of the population was killed and where many bodies were never recovered. Visitors to Nelson County can participate on a self-guided tour of notable locations related to Hurricane Camille. There are exhibits dedicated to Hurricane Camille at the Oakland Museum.

Geology 
Nelsonite, the Virginia state rock, is named for Nelson County. Nelsonite is a distinctive igneous rock composed primarily of the minerals ilmenite and apatite, and as such it's rich in both titanium and calcium phosphate

Geography

The Blue Ridge Mountains form the northwest boundary of the county; the James River forms the boundary to the southeast. Internally, Nelson consists of the Rockfish, Tye and Piney rivers, along with many known creeks.

Adjacent counties
 Augusta County – northwest
 Albemarle County – northeast
 Buckingham County – southeast
 Appomattox County – south
 Amherst County – southwest
 Rockbridge County – west

Nearby towns & cities

 Charlottesville
 Lynchburg
 Waynesboro

National protected areas
 Blue Ridge Parkway (part)
 George Washington National Forest (part)
 United States National Radio Quiet Zone (part)

Major highways

  (extreme northern Nelson County)
  (Thomas Nelson Highway)
  (Richmond Hwy)
  (Rockfish Gap Turnpike)
  (Afton Mountain Rd; River Rd; joins US 29)
  (Crabtree Falls Hwy; Tye Brook Hwy; joins US 29 and US BUS 29 in Lovingston; James River Rd
  (Patrick Henry Hwy; Rockfish Valley Hwy)

Education
Nelson County Public Schools is a Virginia public school division. It operates two elementary schools, one middle school, and one high school. The middle and high schools are connected and located just outside Lovingston, Virginia. Nelson County also provides free GED testing to all adults.

Jefferson-Madison Regional Library is the regional library system that provides services to the citizens of Nelson.

Demographics

2020 census

Note: the US Census treats Hispanic/Latino as an ethnic category. This table excludes Latinos from the racial categories and assigns them to a separate category. Hispanics/Latinos can be of any race.

2010 Census
As of the census of 2010, there were 15,020 people, 6,396 households, and 4,302 families residing in the county. The population density was 31.9 people per square mile (12/km2). There were 8,554 housing units at an average density of 18 per square mile (7/km2). The racial makeup of the county was 83.3% White, 13.1% Black or African American, 0.3% Native American, 0.5% Asian, Z% Pacific Islander, 1.1% from other races, and 1.7% from two or more races. Hispanic or Latino people of any race were 3.1% of the population.

There were 6,396 households, out of which 21.6% had children under the age of 18 living with them, 51.6% were married couples living together, 11.1% had a female householder with no husband present, and 32.7% were non-families. 27.4% of all households were made up of individuals, and 11.1% had someone living alone who was 65 years of age or older. The average household size was 2.33 and the average family size was 2.81.

In the county, the population was spread out, with 19.3% under the age of 18, 5.7% from 18 to 24, 25.5% from 25 to 44, 29.60% from 45 to 64, and 19.9% who were 65 years of age or older. The median age was 42.8 years. For every 100 females there were 95.2 males. For every 100 females age 18 and over, there were 93 males.

The median income for a household in the county was $48,118, and the median income for a family was $57,356. Males had a median income of $45,222 versus $34,842 for females. The per capita income for the county was $26,996. About 8.9% of families and 11.9% of the population were below the poverty line, including 13.8% of those under the age of 18 and 9.5% ages 65 or older.

Recreation

Scenic Drives are popular in Nelson County. Visitors to the county can enjoy mountain views from The Blue Ridge Parkway. The Nelson Scenic Loop is 50 miles long and comprises Route 151, Route 664, the Blue Ridge Parkway, and Route 56.

The Wintergreen Resort near Nellysford opened in 1975. A planned development begun in 1969, it offers 45 holes of championship golf; seasonal skiing, snowboarding and snowtubing. On the eastern slope of the Blue Ridge, Wintergreen is a "top down" resort in which practically all of the amenities are built on the peaks and ridges, rather than at the base like a traditional ski resort.

Sections of the former Virginia Blue Ridge Railway along the Tye River are now part of the Blue Ridge Railway Trail, which was under development in the early 21st century. The trail will eventually connect the James River with the Blue Ridge Parkway and the Appalachian Trail.

Another railway trail is the Claudius Crozet Blue Ridge Tunnel. The Blue Ridge Tunnel is a historic railroad tunnel built during the construction of the Blue Ridge Railroad in the 1850s. The trip through the tunnel is about 2.5 miles long, and the tunnel itself will be part of a greenway system connecting three counties. The tunnel runs through Afton Mountain, under Rockfish Gap, and the Appalachian Trail is located above it as well. The Eastern portal will be in Nelson County.

Fishing and camping are popular activities in Nelson County. Sections of the Tye River are also popular for whitewater boating with canoes and kayaks. The rapids are rated Class I to Class II+. Depending on water conditions, some rapids on the Tye River can approach class III.

The first annual Lockn' Music Festival was held September 5–8, 2013 on a farm in Nelson County near Arrington, Virginia.

Camp Jeep was held at the Oak Ridge Estate in Arrington for several years beginning in 1999, with the last event taking place in 2007.

Attractions/Wedding Venues 
Nelson County is well known for its wedding venues at its craft beverage producers and farms. 
Nelson County is home to  Swannanoa mansion. It is the location of Walton's Mountain, made famous by the television show The Waltons. A new Bed and Breakfast opened to extend The Waltons experience. Nelson County is also home to 12 wineries/vineyards, seven craft breweries, three cideries, three distilleries, six fruit orchards as well as Crabtree Falls and White Rock Falls. Nelson County offers The Quarry Gardens, Pharsalia, and the local library's flower gardens for gardening enthusiasts.

Communities
There are no cities or incorporated towns in Nelson County. It consists of unincorporated communities including census-designated places (CDPs).

Politics

Nelson County is very competitive in presidential elections. The last time any candidate exceeded 55% of the vote was 1984, when Ronald Reagan carried the county in his 49-state landslide.

Notable people
 Leslie Bibb, an American actress and model. Bibb transitioned into film and television during the late 1990s, first appearing on television in 1996 with minor roles in a few television series, while first appearing on film in 1997 with a small role in Private Parts.
 Rita Mae Brown, A social activist for gay and lesbian rights, this entertaining speaker and author has won several prestigious awards. Along with her cat, Sneaky Pie, the Nelson County resident has written a successful series of mystery novels.
 Edward Coles, secretary to James Madison and second governor of Illinois; inherited Rockfish plantation in Nelson County and in June 1819 manumitted (freed) the slaves he brought from that plantation on the Ohio River near Pittsburgh, Pennsylvania on their joint way to the Illinois Territory
 Eli Cook, blues singer, songwriter, guitarist and record producer; released six albums before his 30th birthday
 DeLane Fitzgerald, head football coach at NCAA D1 Southern Utah University
 Jimmy Fortune, former tenor for the Statler Brothers; member of the Gospel and Country Music Hall of Fame
 Reverend Dr. William Archer Rutherfoord Goodwin, grew up in Nelson County during the Reconstruction era after the American Civil War; priest and rector; created Colonial Williamsburg beginning in 1926
 Earl Hamner Jr., born and raised in Schuyler; writer best known for the Emmy-winning CBS television series The Waltons, was based on his experiences of growing up in a large rural family in Depression era America
 Dr. Gessner Harrison, in 1860 established Locust Grove Academy, a boarding school for boys in the northernmost part of the county
 Walter Loving, commander of the Philippine Constabulary Band; first African-American to direct a musical performance at the White House
 William Porcher Miles, South Carolina-born states' rights advocate; former U.S. and Confederate congressman; briefly managed Oak Ridge plantation near Lovingston after the Civil War
 Robert Monroe, out-of-body experience researcher who founded the Monroe Institute; lived in Faber
 Thomas Massie, military officer during the American Revolution and Virginia planter
 James Leroy Murrill, last Confederate veteran of the Civil War
 William Rives, tobacco magnate; built Oak Ridge plantation near Lovingston
 Thomas Fortune Ryan, born near Lovingston; bought Oak Ridge plantation after becoming rich in New York City by consolidating transportation and tobacco companies

See also
 National Register of Historic Places listings in Nelson County, Virginia

References

External links

 Nelson County's official website
 Wintergreen Resort
 Blue Ridge Life Magazine

 
1807 establishments in Virginia
Populated places established in 1807
Counties on the James River (Virginia)